Hordaland Folkeblad (The Hordaland People's Gazette) is a local Norwegian newspaper published in Norheimsund in Hordaland county. 

The newspaper was established in 1873 and is one of the oldest local newspapers in Norway. It covers news in the municipalities of Kvam and Jondal. Hordaland Folkeblad is published twice a week, on Tuesdays and Fridays, and appears in Nynorsk. Locally, the newspaper is often referred to as Skaaralappen ('Skaar's slip') after Nils Nilsson Skaar (1852–1948), who became the paper's editor in 1878 and its sole owner in 1889. The current editor is Sigbjørn Linga, who assumed the position in 2013.

Circulation
According to the Norwegian Media Businesses' Association, Hordaland Folkeblad has had the following annual circulation:
2006: 5,733
2007: 5,790
2008: 5,799
2009: 5,762
2010: 5,680
2011: 5,620
2012: 5,633
2013: 5,608
2014: 5,520
2015: 5,482
2016: 5,299

References

External links
Hordaland Folkeblad home page

Newspapers published in Norway
Norwegian-language newspapers
Mass media in Hordaland
Kvam
Publications established in 1873
1873 establishments in Norway
Nynorsk